The Jakarta Globe is a daily online English-language newspaper in Indonesia, launched in November 2008.

The paper initially came out as a print newspaper with an average of 48 pages a day, and published Monday to Saturday. It had three sections, and contained (in section A) a range of general news, including metropolitan and national news coverage as well as international news, plus comment, (in section B) Indonesian and world business and sport plus a classified advertising section, and (in section C) an extensive features and lifestyle coverage as well as entertainment, listings and reader service and puzzle/cartoon pages. The newspaper later added a Sunday Jakarta Globe edition. The newspaper converted from broadsheet to tabloid format in May 2012, and then was published online only from 15 December 2015.

The newspaper's owner, PT Jakarta Globe Media, is part of Enggartiasto Lukita's B Universe (formerly BeritaSatu Media Holdings, an associated company of Lippo).

See also

 List of newspapers in Indonesia
 Media of Indonesia

References

External links
 Jakarta Globe'' website: https://jakartaglobe.id (formerly http://thejakartaglobe.com )

Indonesian press
Defunct newspapers published in Indonesia
Mass media in Jakarta
Newspapers established in 2008
Publications disestablished in 2015
2008 establishments in Indonesia
Online newspapers with defunct print editions
Indonesian news websites